Deuteragonista lutea is a species of dance flies, in the fly family Empididae.

References

Empididae
Insects described in 1909
Taxa named by Mario Bezzi
Diptera of South America